John Hobildod (died c. 1421), of Tadlow, Cambridgeshire, was an English politician.

He was a Member (MP) of the Parliament of England for Cambridgeshire in 1402, 1411 and 1416. He was High Sheriff of Cambridgeshire and Huntingdonshire for 1403–04 and 1407–08.

References

14th-century births
1421 deaths
English MPs 1402
People from Tadlow
High Sheriffs of Cambridgeshire and Huntingdonshire
English MPs 1411
English MPs October 1416